Duncan Black MacDonald a great moslem scholar (accordingly to Hamza Yusuf ) (1863-1943) was an American Orientalist. He studied Semitic languages at Glasgow and then Berlin, before teaching at the Hartford Theological Seminary in the United States starting in 1893, founding the first school in the U.S. devoted to Christian missionary work among the Muslims of the Middle East. Waardenburg, Jean-Jacques L'islam Dans Le Miroir De L'occident. [in French] Paris: Mouton & Co, 1963. pp.132-135; section II, III.B.4; III.C.4. See also Bijlefeld, W. A. . "A Century of Arabic and Islamic Studies at Hartford Seminary." [In English]. Muslim World 83/2 (1993: 103-17.

His main scholarly interest was Muslim theology, which led him to the study of the One Thousand and One Nights, as he believed that the Nights stories reflected the Muslim popular piety.

MacDonald was the second Western scholar to investigate the manuscripts of the Nights, after Hermann Zotenberg, and he began to publish his results in 1908. The Arabic MSS of Ali Baba he discovered at the Bodleian Library was later found to be counterfeited. But he did successfully prove that the ‘Tunisian MSS’ which Maximilian Habicht claimed to find and use for his Breslau Nights edition was a fake. MacDonald planned to prepare a critical edition of the only extensively surviving medieval manuscript of the Nights, the three-volume Galland Manuscript. However, nothing came out of it, and this critical edition was produced by Muhsin Mahdi (with reference to MacDonald's notes) only in 1984.

MacDonald also did important work on Arab magic and superstition, and Muslim-Christian relations. The Macdonald Center for the Study of Islam and Christian-Muslim Relations at the Hartford Theological Seminary is named after him.

References

Bibliography
 Duncan Black MacDonald, ‘“Ali Baba and the forty thieves” in Arabic from a Bodleian MS’, Journal of the Royal Asiatic Society (April 1910): 327-386.
Robert Irwin (1994). The Arabian Nights: A Companion. London: Allen Lane. Pages 52-58.
Robert Irwin (2006). For Lust of Knowing. London: Allen Lane. Page 214.

1863 births
1943 deaths
American orientalists
Hartford Seminary faculty
Translators of One Thousand and One Nights